KCMH (91.5 FM) is a radio station broadcasting a Christian radio format. Licensed to Mountain Home, Arkansas, United States, the station is currently owned by Christian Broadcasting Group of Mountain Home, Inc., and features programming from USA Radio Network.

History
The station was launched on October 1, 1985.  On March 11, 1987, the station changed its call sign to the current KCMH.

References

External links
 
 

CMH
Moody Radio affiliate stations
Mountain Home, Arkansas